Phupgaon is a village in Kalahandi district, Odisha, India and this gram panchayat comes under Kokasara tehsil. It is 4 km away from its main town and block (Panchayat Samiti) Kokasara.

Villages in Kalahandi district